Note: This ship should not be confused with two other World War I-era ships named USS Mystery.

The second USS Mystery (ID-2744), often identified as SP-2744, was a minesweeper support ship that served in the United States Navy from 1918 to 1919.
 Mystery in merchant service, ca. 1918|left | upright | thumbMystery was built in 1886 by A. C. Brown at Tottenville, New York, as a commercial fishing trawler. The 3rd Naval District inspected her on May 7, 1918 for possible World War I U.S. Navy service.  The Navy chartered her from Empire Water Co., Inc., of New York City on 18 July 1918, took her over 20 August 1918, assigned her Identification Number (ID. No. 2744) and commissioned her as USS Mystery (ID-2744) on 2 September 1918. Confusingly, the designation "SP-2744" was painted on her bow and this designation is reported as her official one by many sources, although this contradicted her official data card, which identifies her as "Id. No. 2744," a more likely official designation for her given that "SP" numbers were usually much lower and because she did not have the patrol vessel role of most "SP" boats.

Assigned to the 3rd Naval District, Mystery served as a support ship for minesweepers operating in the approaches to New York Harbor. Her career overlapped with that of the first USS Mystery (SP-428).Mystery'' was returned to her owner on 18 January 1919.

Notes

References
 
 Department of the Navy: Naval Historical Center: Online Library of Selected Images: U.S. Navy Ships: USS Mystery (ID # 2744), 1918-1919. Previously the civilian fishing boat Mystery, built in 1886
 NavSource Online: Section Patrol Craft Photo Archive Mystery (SP 2744)

World War I auxiliary ships of the United States
Ships built in Staten Island
1886 ships
Miscellaneous auxiliaries of the United States Navy